Kobavici is a small settlement in the Labinstina peninsula in Istria County, Croatia. Kobavici is grouped with a few other settlements and is known as Sveti Lovrec Labinski.The name of the settlement was named after the first settlers, Kobavici

References

See also
Labinstina

Populated places in Istria County